The Jericho Governorate is one of 16 Governorates of Palestine. Its capital is Jericho. The governorate is located along the eastern areas of the West Bank, along the northern Dead Sea and southern Jordan River valley bordering Jordan. It spans west to the mountains east of Ramallah and the eastern slopes of Jerusalem, including the northern reaches of the Judaean Desert. The population of the Jericho Governorate is estimated to be 50,002, including 13,334 Palestinian refugees in the governorate's camps.

Agriculture is important to the economy in the district, especially in the valley near Jericho, its capital. Jericho is often considered the oldest settlement in the world; its many historic and archaeological sites attract numerous tourists to the area.

Ein as-Sultan (also known as "Elijah's Spring") is an oasis in Jericho that works as one of the main touristic spots in the area.

Localities

Cities
 Jericho

Municipalities
 al-Auja
 al-Jiftlik

Villages
 Fasayil
 an-Nuway'imah
 Ein ad-Duyuk at-Tahta
 Ein ad-Duyuk al-Foqa
 az-Zubaidat
Marj al-Ghazal

Refugee camps
 Aqabat Jaber
 Ein as-Sultan

References

 
Governorates of the Palestinian National Authority in the West Bank